The 2001 WNBA season was the 2nd season for the Indiana Fever. In the 2001 WNBA Draft, the Fever drafted Tamika Catchings as the 3rd pick, but due to a college injury, she missed the entire 2001 season. With that, the Fever tied with two teams with the worst record in the Eastern Conference, only ahead of the Detroit Shock and the Washington Mystics.

Offseason

WNBA Draft

Regular season

Season standings

Season schedule

Player stats

References

Indiana Fever seasons
Indiana
Indiana Fever